This is a complete List of ghost towns in North Dakota.

 Alfred
 Antler
 Arena
 Aurelia
 Bently
 Berlin
 Braddock
 Brisbane
 Clyde
 Charbonneau
 Chaseley
 Churchs Ferry
 Crystal Springs
 Denhoff
 Dodge
 Dogtooth
 Douglas
 Dunn Center
 Elbowoods
 Epworth
 Fort Buford
 Gorham
 Hartland
 Heaton
 Kramer
 Landa
 Leipzig
 Lonetree
 Manning
 Melville
 Mose
 Omeemee
 Petrel
 Sanger
 Sherbrooke
 Sims
 Shell Creek
 Tagus
 Temple
 Temvik
 Verendrye
 Wabek
 Walem
 Wheelock

External links
Ghosts of North Dakota

Notes and references

 
North Dakota
Ghost towns